Nakhon Nayok is a town in Thailand.

Nakhon Nayok may also refer to:
Nakhon Nayok Province, a central province of Thailand
Amphoe Mueang Nakhon Nayok, the capital district of Nakhon Nayok Province
Nakhon Nayok River, a river of Thailand